Seiji Chihara (born 14 April 1963) is a Japanese rower. He competed in the men's eight event at the 1988 Summer Olympics.

References

1963 births
Living people
Japanese male rowers
Olympic rowers of Japan
Rowers at the 1988 Summer Olympics
Place of birth missing (living people)